The Autorité de Régulation des Communications Électroniques et de la Poste (ARCEP) is an independent agency in charge of regulating telecommunications and postal services in Chad.

External links

References 

Government  of Chad

Mass media regulation
Regulation in Chad